Lewis Este Mills (August 13, 1836 – April 10, 1878) was an American lawyer and author. He was born in Morristown, New Jersey, on August 13, 1836, the son of.  Lewis and Sarah A. Mills.

He graduated from Yale College in 1856. He studied law at first in Morristown, and later completed his studies in Cincinnati, where he was admitted to the bar in November 1858. Mills became a partner in the firm of Mills & Hoadly, in which his elder brother Edward Mills was the senior member. In 1859, he formed a partnership with A. T. Goshorn in the same city.

He joined the Union Army late in the Civil War, as a volunteer aide-de-camp on the staff of Gen. R. B. Potter, and served in the Army of the Southwest during that year's campaign, which included the siege of Vicksburg.

Returning to Cincinnati, he married Jean Springer, daughter of Charles Springer, on January 7, 1864.  After his marriage, Mills gradually withdrew from active practice and devoted himself to travel and literary pursuits. He published a revision of Handy's Reports of the Superior Court of Cincinnati (in 1877), and printed privately (in 1867) a volume of Glimpses of Southern France and Spain. He went to Europe for the fourth time in summer 1877. After traveling in Normandy and passing the winter in Brussels, he reached Florence, Italy, in an invalid condition. There, while wasting away from a disease of the kidneys, he died from a sudden attack of heart-disease on April 10, 1878, at age 42. His wife survived him, without children.

External links
 

1836 births
1878 deaths
People from Morristown, New Jersey
Yale College alumni
Ohio lawyers
American male writers
Union Army personnel
19th-century American lawyers